Jean-Philippe Mendy (born 4 March 1987) is a French footballer of Senegalese descent who plays . Initially a midfielder, he was later in his career moved forward.

Career
Mendy started playing football, aged 6, at OSC Élancourt, before moving, aged 12, to FC Versailles 78, and at some point after, to Football Croix-de-Savoie 74, now known as Evian Thonon Gaillard F.C. Aged 14, he spent some time at Clairefontaine.

In the summer of 2006, he played a single friendly match for the Swiss third-tier side CS Chênois, a 5–0 loss against the Romanian team Dinamo București. Despite the loss, he was noticed by Dinamo's coach Mircea Rednic, and brought to the Romanian club. Despite never officially being a CS Chênois player, he was erroneously presented as such by the Romanian media.

He made his debut for the Bucharest club on 11 November 2006, coming in the 83rd minute for Claudiu Niculescu, in a 3–0 home win against FC Oțelul Galați. His UEFA Cup debut was on 14 December 2006, after he came in for Ionel Dănciulescu in the 77th minute of the 3–1 away loss vs. Tottenham Hotspur and scored, in the 91st minute, what would prove to be his first and only goal for Dinamo's senior team.

After the 2006–07 season, he spent time on loan at second-tier side Petrolul Ploieşti, and Dinamo's B side, also playing at that level, but the rest of his time in Romania was marred by a knee injury and operation, suffered after another player fell on it. Because of that, he would only feature in one more match for Dinamo, in July 2009. After his recovery, he signed in the beginning of 2011 for the Italian Lega Pro Prima Divisione team SPAL 1907. However, his convalescence was not yet over, leaving him unable to sprint properly, so he required another operation, losing another year of football.

He was brought to Slovenia by Koper's coach Rodolfo Vanoli, who saw him play at SPAL. In summer 2013, he moved to the Slovenian champions Maribor, where he went on to score 14 goals in 29 league matches in his first season. In three seasons playing for Maribor, he scored a total of 42 goals in 125 appearances for the club in all competitions.

In June 2016 he moved to the Chinese Super League team Shijiazhuang Ever Bright.

Personal life
Mendy, a child of Senegalese parents born in France, is multilingual, speaking five languages: English, Italian, Romanian, French, and Wolof. In April 2014 he got married in Maribor to Lisette Mendy and became a father to a son in May.

Honours
Dinamo București
 Liga I (1): 2006–07
Maribor
 Slovenian PrvaLiga (2): 2013–14, 2014–15
 Slovenian Cup (1): 2015–16
 Slovenian Supercup (1): 2014
PT Prachuap
 Thai League Cup (1): 2019

References

External links
 
 
 NZS profile 

1987 births
Living people
French sportspeople of Senegalese descent
French footballers
Association football forwards
French expatriate footballers
FC Dinamo București players
FC Petrolul Ploiești players
S.P.A.L. players
FC Koper players
NK Maribor players
Cangzhou Mighty Lions F.C. players
Baniyas Club players
Al Urooba Club players
NK Slaven Belupo players
Jean-Philippe Mendy
Liga I players
Serie C players
Slovenian PrvaLiga players
Chinese Super League players
UAE Pro League players
Croatian Football League players
Jean-Philippe Mendy
UAE First Division League players
Expatriate footballers in Romania
French expatriate sportspeople in Romania
Expatriate footballers in Italy
French expatriate sportspeople in Italy
Expatriate footballers in Slovenia
French expatriate sportspeople in Slovenia
Expatriate footballers in China
French expatriate sportspeople in China
Expatriate footballers in the United Arab Emirates
French expatriate sportspeople in the United Arab Emirates
Expatriate footballers in Croatia
French expatriate sportspeople in Croatia
Expatriate footballers in Thailand
French expatriate sportspeople in Thailand